Chantal Benoit  (born October 1, 1960) is a Canadian wheelchair basketball player. She is considered the best female wheelchair basketball player in history.

Benoit played in the Canadian woman's wheelchair basketball team since 1984, and won 3 paralympic gold medals and a bronze one, and participated in five summer Paralympics including the 1994 games at Stoke Mandeville.

When she was young she had cancer, and lost her leg.

International competition
 Silver in 1986 Pan-American Games in Puerto Rico 
 4th place in 1988 Seoul Paralympic Games in Seoul, South Korea 
 Bronze medal in 1990 Gold Cup World Championships in France 
 Gold medal  1992 Barcelona Paralympic Games Barcelona, Spain 
 Gold medal  1994 Gold Cup World Championships England 
 Gold 1996 Atlanta Paralympic Games Atlanta, USA 
 Gold 1998 Qualification of the Americas Winnipeg, Canada 
 Gold 1998 Gold Cup World Championships Sydney, Australia (+ MVP award!) 
 Gold 2000 Sydney Paralympic Games Sydney, Australia 
 Gold 2002 Gold Cup World Championships Kitakyushu, Japan 
 Bronze 2004 Athens Paralympic Games Athens, Greece 
 Gold 2006 Gold Cup World Championships Amsterdam, The Netherlands 
 Gold 2007 Osaka Cup Osaka, Japan 
 Bronze 2007 4 Nations Tournament Sydney, Australia 
 Silver 2007 Parapanamerican Games Rio de Janeiro, Brazil 
 Bronze 2008 North American Cup Birmingham, Al, USA 
 Bronze 2010 World Championships Birmingham, UK 

Other accomplishments:
 2008 Wheelchair Basketball Canada - Female Athlete of the Year 
 Canada's Flag bearer at the 2004 Summer Paralympics

References

External links
 Wheelchairbasketball.ca
 London2012.com 

Canadian women's wheelchair basketball players
1960 births
Living people
Medalists at the 1992 Summer Paralympics
Medalists at the 1996 Summer Paralympics
Medalists at the 2000 Summer Paralympics
Medalists at the 2004 Summer Paralympics
Officers of the Order of Canada
Wheelchair basketball players at the 1992 Summer Paralympics
Wheelchair basketball players at the 1996 Summer Paralympics
Wheelchair basketball players at the 2000 Summer Paralympics
Wheelchair basketball players at the 2004 Summer Paralympics
Wheelchair basketball players at the 1988 Summer Paralympics
Paralympic gold medalists for Canada
Paralympic bronze medalists for Canada
Paralympic medalists in wheelchair basketball
Paralympic wheelchair basketball players of Canada